The Mildenhall Fen Tigers are a British speedway team, founded in 1975 and currently riding in the National Development League.

History

1971–1989
The original track was built in 1971 on farm land owned by Terry Waters, with chef Bernie Klatt the driving force behind establishing speedway in Mildenhall. Klatt had been the head chef at the officers club at the nearby air force base, and later established a restaurant at the track. The track moved to a second area on the same farm in 1973. After running as a training track, the Mildenhall team entered the New National League (division 2) in 1975.

The team competed in division 2 for 15 consecutive seasons from 1975 to 1989. Their best season was the 1979 National League season, where the team won the league title.

1990–2005

The team disbanded after the 1989 season but the track remained open from 1990 to 1991. The 1992 season started with fixtures in the Gold Cup and league before the team withdrew from the 1992 British League Division Two season. The club finally found some stability in 1994 when they joined the third tier of British speedway. They had 12 seasons in division 3 and won the league and cup double twice during the 2003 Speedway Conference League and 2004 Speedway Conference League.

2006–present
The club moved up to the Premier League in 2006 when new promoter Mick Horton took over. He also formed a junior side called the Mildenhall Academy that rode in the 2006 Speedway Conference League.

In 2007, Stadium owner Carl Harris formed Fen Tigers Limited with the intention of selling the company shares to the fans. Lifelong supporter Simon Barton bought a major shareholding in the club until the promotion sold to Keith & Jonathan Chapman in August 2008. Team manager Laurence Rogers was replaced with former Tigers rider Richard Knight. At the beginning of the season the club struggled to find a sponsor, so uniquely, the fans collectively sponsored the team. Following the 2008 season the club dropped back down to the third division.

In 2010, the team withdrew from the league and had their results expunged but the following season they bounced back by winning the Knockout Cup. The 2012 National League speedway season was even better as they won the league and cup double, although finishing 2nd in the regular season table they won the play off final. 

In 2021, the team competes in the third division for the 12th consecutive season and ran out the champions for the fourth time since 2003.

After the 2022 campaign there was uncertainty as to whether the club could line up for the 2023 season but in January it was announced they would compete.

Season summary

Riders previous seasons

2006 team

 
 
 
 
 
 
 
 
 
 
 

2007 team
 
 
 
 
 
 
 
 

Also Rode:
 
 

2008 team
 
 
 
 
 
 
 

Also Rode:

 
 
 
 
 
 
 
 
 
 
  (Signed at the start of the season, but did not ride.)

2009 team

 
 
 
 
 
 
 

2010 team

 

 
 
 
 
 

2011 team

 
 
 
 
 
 
 

2012 team

 
 
 
 
 
 
 
 

2013 team

 
 
 
 
 
 
 
 

2014 team

 
 
 
 
 
 
 

2015 team
 
 
 
 
 
 
 

2019 team
 Ryan Kinsley
 Jason Edwards
 Charlie Brooks
 Henry Atkins
 Matt Marson
 Elliot Kelly
 Aaron Butcher

2021 team

2022 team
 10.50
 7.06
 7.02
 7.00
 6.83
 6.21
 5.88

References

Speedway Premier League teams
Sport in Suffolk
National League speedway teams
Mildenhall, Suffolk